The House of Darkness is a 1913 American short drama film directed by  D. W. Griffith.

Plot
In the introduction a woman is shown descending into insanity after having lost her baby. As she mourns, she takes a blanket from the baby's cradle and starts rocking it as if it were her deceased child. This serves as an introduction to what kind of individuals that reside at the mental institution. The doctor at the hospital is also introduced as he proposes to a nurse.

The remainder of the film takes place at the aforementioned setting which hosts several unstable individuals. When violence erupts between two patients; one of them (played by Charles Hill Mailes) escapes the scene in an attempt to avoid capture. At the climax of the chase; the patient is ultimately soothed by the music emitting from a piano in the main hospital building (Lillian Gish in a minor role) and lets himself be taken away by the guards. As he is removed from the vicinity of the music; he once again becomes violent and escapes the grasp of his attendants. After having come upon a gun he makes his way towards the house of the doctor's wife (during this sequence, the perhaps most interesting part of the film seen out of a technical perspective takes place as the lunatic sticks his head out in front of the camera from behind a tree). When the woman discovers him; she becomes terrified. During the farce; the wife puts her hands on the piano by accident, creating a sound which appears pleasing to the lunatic. He urges her to continue, using the gun as a tool of persuasion. She proceeds with the playing which ultimately results in him leaving the house and once again welcomes capture.

The film ends informing the viewer on how music becomes an integral part in aiding mentally unstable individuals.

Cast
 Lionel Barrymore as The Doctor
 Claire McDowell as The Doctor's Wife
 Charles Hill Mailes as The Lunatic aka The 'Unfortunate' Patient
 Lillian Gish as Nurse Playing Piano
 Dorothy Bernard (unconfirmed)
 Adelaide Bronti as In Tenement Apartment
 Kate Bruce as A Patient
 William J. Butler as Extra
 W. Christy Cabanne as Attack Victim
 William Elmer as Asylum Guard (as Billy Elmer)
 Robert Harron as Asylum Guard
 Adolph Lestina as A Patient
 Joseph McDermott as Asylum Guard / Searcher
 Walter Miller as A Clerk
 Frank Opperman as A Patient / A Clerk
 Alfred Paget as Asylum Guard
 W.C. Robinson as Asylum Guard
 Henry B. Walthall

See also
 D. W. Griffith filmography
 Lillian Gish filmography
 Lionel Barrymore filmography

References

External links

 The House of Darkness on YouTube
The House of Darkness available for download at Archive.org

1913 films
1913 drama films
1913 short films
Silent American drama films
American silent short films
American black-and-white films
Articles containing video clips
Biograph Company films
Films directed by D. W. Griffith
1910s American films